Maithil Karna Kayasthak Panjik Sarvekshan (A Survey of the Panji of the Karan Kayasthas of Mithila) is a book written by Binod Bihari Verma in Maithili. It is a research study on the available ancient manuscripts in the Mithila region, called as Panjis, which are genealogical charts of Maithil Brahmin and Kayasthas castes. This study deals with the manuscripts available in respect of Karna Kayasthas.

Overview
The work is based on several manuscripts of Panjis obtained from various panjikars of Darbhanga, Bihar. The Panjis concerned deals with the genealogy of the Karna Kayasthas. The manuscript is written in Tirhuta script (Maithili script) on palm leaves and old paper called as 'Basaha' made out of indigenous material. The work deals with Mulgrams (original village homes) and the transmigration of the Karna Kayasthas to subsequent places of living. The book is important for the geographical and social study of North Bihar of the concerned period. The work also deals with personalities of eminence among the Karna Kayasthas since 12th century. Dr (Prof) Surendra Lal Das  along with Panjikars and other eminent Karna kayastha members  formed "Akhil Bhartiya Karn kayastha Mahasabha" to protect the original and traditional values of Panji .

Chapters
Pustak parichay evam lekhak parichay(Introduction to the book and its writer)
Prakkathhan(Foreword)
Nivedan O srot pandulipi (Introduction and the sources of the manuscript)
Panjik purv aitehaasik prishthbhumi(Historical background before the usage of Panjis)
Karan', 'karnik' o 'kayasth (Introduction to the terminologies of 'Karan', 'Karnik' and 'Kayasth')
Upadhik spashtikaran (Explanatory notes on the surnames)
Panji prakaran (A perspective of Panjis)
Panjik uddeshya tatha pratifal (Usage of Panjis and their significance)
Panjik parampara (Tradition of Panjis)
Panjik adhyayan evam lekhan vidhi (Study of Panjis and the methodology of transcribing them)
Panjikarak parampara (Traditions of Panjis writers)
Panjik kaal (Age of panjis)
Maithil brahminak panji sa tulna (Comparison with Panjis of Maithil Brahmins)
Prathamagaman o prasthan (Initial arrivals and departures)
Purvabhas(Concept)
Mul gram (Original residences or villages in the migration)
Dera o baas sthaan (Subsequent residences or dwellings in the migration)
Mulgram o deraak aitehaasikta (Historical importance of the Mulgram and Dera)
Derak parichit sthaan (Identification of the deras)
Patra parichay (Introduction to protagonists)
Vyaktitiva o purush (Personalities and persons)
Biji purushak pashchaat vanshavali (Genealogical charts of the seed persons)
Vibhinn mul gramak panjik aarambhik purush gan (Panjis of the original people of various mul grams)
Kichu biji purush sa adyaparyant vanshaavali (Genealogical charts of certain seed persons) 
Prakkathan (Afterword)

Release details
 
 Contains 2 black and white plates of the Panjis manuscripts.

See also
 Darbhanga
 Mithila
 Paag

External links
 Kinship ritual and visual imagery in Mithila

1973 non-fiction books
Books on Mithila Region
Culture of Bihar
Culture of Mithila
Indian genealogy
Indian non-fiction books
Maithili-language books
History of Bihar
Manuscripts
Social history of India
20th-century Indian books